Le Espicer is a surname. Notable people with the surname include:

Robert le Espicer, Gloucester MP
John le Espicer, York MP